Dejan Poljaković (born 6 April 1973) is a Croatian football midfielder.

Club career
Poljaković played his early career in Serbia. He played with FK Bačka 1901 before joining FK Spartak Subotica playing with them in the First League of FR Yugoslavia. In 2001, he joined Újpest FC and played in the Hungarian Nemzeti Bajnokság I in 2001–02.  In 2002–03 he played with Ujpest til the winter-break, when he moved to HNK Rijeka playing in the Croatian First League.

Honors
Ujpest
Hungarian Cup: 2002

References

1973 births
Living people
Association football midfielders
Croatian footballers
FK Bačka 1901 players
FK Spartak Subotica players
Újpest FC players
HNK Rijeka players
First League of Serbia and Montenegro players
Nemzeti Bajnokság I players
Croatian Football League players
Croatian expatriate footballers
Expatriate footballers in Serbia and Montenegro
Croatian expatriate sportspeople in Serbia and Montenegro
Expatriate footballers in Hungary
Croatian expatriate sportspeople in Hungary